"It Won't Be Me" is a song written by Tom Shapiro and Chris Waters, and recorded by American country music artist Tanya Tucker.  It was released in October 1990 as the third single from the album Tennessee Woman.  The song reached #6 on the Billboard Hot Country Singles & Tracks chart.

Chart performance

Year-end charts

References

1991 singles
Tanya Tucker songs
Songs written by Tom Shapiro
Songs written by Chris Waters
Capitol Records Nashville singles
Song recordings produced by Jerry Crutchfield
1990 songs